Dr Graeme Sutherland (born 25 December 1964) is a free-lance writer, mainly specialising in broadcast comedy.

He has contributed to the BBC Radio 4 satirical sketch show Week Ending and three series of the BBC Scotland TV comedy The Karen Dunbar Show.

Sutherland's script Hit (co-written with Philip Cartwright) reached the finals of the BBC's Talent 2000 Situation Comedy competition.

Sutherland also authored the "Mr Angry" chapter of Working with Anger: A Constructivist Approach (Wiley, 2006 - Peter Cummins, Editor), a non-fiction psychology reader.

In 2018, Sutherland graduated as Doctor of Education from the University of Warwick, his thesis is entitled:   Grade decisions: how observers make judgements in the observation of teaching and learning.

DVD
Credited as writer on The Best of the Karen Dunbar Show - Series 1 (John Williams Productions DVD Release Date: 17 Feb 2003)

References

1 also Graeme Sutherland at IMDB 

2 Working with Anger: A Constructivist Approach (2006, Wiley) Peter Cummins (Editor)   - Chapter 8. Mr Angry (Graeme Sutherland)

Living people
British humorists
British radio writers
British television writers
1964 births